Lugansky (feminine: Luganskaya) is a Russian-language surname derived from the city of Lugansk. Notable people with the surname include:

Nikolai Lugansky (born 1972), Russian pianist 
Sergey Lugansky (1917–1977), Soviet ace

Russian-language surnames
Toponymic surnames